Daniel Lysons may refer to:
Daniel Lysons (antiquarian) (1762–1834), English antiquarian and topographer
Daniel Lysons (British Army officer) (1816–1898), British general, son of the antiquarian
Daniel Lysons (physician) (1727–1800), English academic and physician, uncle of the antiquarian